Cast is a rock band from Mexico. Formed in 1978, they specialize in progressive rock, similar in style to early Genesis. Their music focuses strongly on keyboards, guitars and vocals. The band host an annual progressive rock festival called Baja Prog in Mexicali, Baja California, Mexico, which features bands from around the world.

Band members
Alfonso Vidales – keyboards
Lupita Acuña – backing vocals
Roberto Izzo – violin
Bobby Vidales – lead vocals
Carlos Humarán – bass
Antonio Bringas – drums
Claudio Cordero – electric guitar

Discography 

Landing in a Serious Mind (1994/2005)
Sounds of Imagination (1994)
Third Call (1994)
Four Aces (1995)
Endless Signs (1995)
Beyond Reality (1996)
A View of Cast (1996)(compil)
Angels and Demons (1997)
Baja Prog 98 (live) (1998)
Tema 98 (1998)
A Live Experience (1999)
Imaginary Window (1999)
Legacy (2000)(dvd)
Laguna de Volcanes (2000)(compil)
Castalia (2001)(live)
Infinity (2002)
Al-Bandaluz (2003)
Nimbus (2004)
Pyramid of the Rain (2005)'compil)
Legado (live DVD) (2006)
Mosaïque (2006)
Com.Unión (2007)
Originallis (2008)
Art (2011)
Arsis (2014)
Cast Vida (2015)
Power and Outcome (2017)
Vigesimus (2021)

External links
Official site 
Baja Prog home page
MySpace page for band

Mexican rock music groups
Mexican progressive rock groups
Musea artists